Hayman's dwarf epauletted fruit bat or Hayman's epauletted fruit bat (Micropteropus intermedius) is a species of megabat in the family Pteropodidae. It is found in Angola and Democratic Republic of the Congo. Its natural habitats are subtropical or tropical moist lowland forest and moist savanna.

References

Micropteropus
Taxonomy articles created by Polbot
Mammals described in 1963
Bats of Africa